The 1966 FIVB Men's World Championship was the sixth edition of the tournament, organised by the world's governing body, the FIVB. It was held from 30 August to 11 September 1966 in Czechoslovakia.

Qualification
For the first time the teams were restricted to 24. First 12 teams from 1962 World Championship (including host country) and 3 teams from each continent (Europe, Asia, America and Africa) were qualified to 1966 edition.

* Only Morocco from Africa confirmed participation, Belgium and Finland replaced the other African teams. Mexico, Israel and Morocco were replaced by Cuba, Denmark and West Germany. Also Argentina and North Korea did not arrive for the Championship but there were no more European teams to replace them.

Venues

Results

First round

Pool A
Location: Prague

|}

|}

Pool B
Location: Nitra

|}

|}

Pool C
Location: České Budějovice

|}

|}

Pool D
Location: Jihlava

|}

|}

Final round
The results and the points of the matches between the same teams that were already played during the first round are taken into account for the final round.

17th–22nd places
Location: Prague

|}

|}

9th–16th places
Location: Pardubice

|}

|}

Final places
Location: Pardubice

|}

|}

Final standing

External links
 Federation Internationale de Volleyball

FIVB Men's World Championship
FIVB Men's World Championship
V
V
FIVB Volleyball Men's World Championship
August 1966 sports events in Europe
September 1966 sports events in Europe
1960s in Prague